The Hypercalliinae are a subfamily of small moths in the family Depressariidae.

Genera
Anchinia Hübner, [1825]
Coptotelia Zeller, 1863
Gonionota Zeller, 1877
Hypercallia Stephens, 1829

References

 
Depressariidae
Moth subfamilies